Pirbudag (1403/1404October 1418, reigned 1411October 1414) was the first ruler of Kara Koyunlu as an independent sultanate.

Life 
Pirbudag was the eldest son of Qara Yusuf, born around 1403 during his father's captivity, together with Ahmad Jalayir, in Damascus. In prison the two leaders renewed their friendship, making an agreement that Jalayir should keep Baghdad while Qara Yusuf would have Azerbaijan.

Reign 
After the death of Ahmad Jalayir, Pirbudag was crowned sultan by his father Qara Yusuf in 1411 at the age of eight or nine. He is recorded to have been the commander of raiding party in Aintab pursuing Qara Osman. He died unexpectedly in October 1418.

References 

1418 deaths
1403 births
Qara Qoyunlu rulers